Toledo Express Airport, officially Eugene F. Kranz Toledo Express Airport , is a civil-military airport in Swanton and Monclova townships  west of Toledo in western Lucas County, Ohio, United States. It opened in 1954-55 as a replacement to then Toledo Municipal Airport southeast of Toledo. TOL is near the crossing of State Route 2 and the Ohio Turnpike (Interstate 80/Interstate 90, exit 52).

TOL is used by passenger and cargo airlines, general aviation, and is home to the Ohio Air National Guard's 180th Fighter Wing. The airport is a secondary airport for Detroit Metropolitan Airport (DTW) and the surrounding region, including as a primary diversion point for DTW. The airport is operated by the Toledo–Lucas County Port Authority on a lease agreement from the City of Toledo. The airport also serves as headquarters and ground cargo hub for BX Solutions.

Through the 1980s and 1990s the airport saw considerable airline service with as many as seven airlines at any given time operating over 40 flights per day to fourteen destinations. Traffic peaked in 1997 then began a downfall as many passengers began driving to nearby Detroit Metropolitan Airport, a major hub airport. By 2011 all but two airlines had discontinued service. Traffic bottomed out in 2012 then began a slow growth. In 2015 Toledo Express recorded its third straight year of passenger growth, reaching 179,911.

In 2018, buoyed by growing service to and from Charlotte, air travel through Toledo Express Airport increased by more than 22 percent for its sixth straight year of growth. Total passenger service reached 241,299 passengers in 2018.

The airport was officially renamed to honor retired NASA flight director and Toledo native Gene Kranz in September 2020.

History
Efforts to build a modern airport started shortly after World War II, when civic leaders realized that Toledo Municipal Airport (today's Toledo Executive Airport) was inadequate. A number of locations were proposed and discarded until 1952, when a consortium of six major Toledo companies – Libbey-Owens-Ford, Owens-Illinois, Owens-Corning Fiberglas, Champion Spark Plug, Electric Auto-Lite, and Willys-Overland – acquired the site of Toledo Express Airport west of Toledo and sold the land to the city at cost. 

The airport received nearly $3 million from the federal CARES Act during the covid-19 pandemic. The money went to helping the airport upgrade facilities and continue normal operation during the pandemic's travel downturn.

Historical Airline Service
The airlines moved to the new airport around the beginning of 1955; the April 1957 Official Airline Guide (OAG) lists thirteen weekday United Airlines departures, six Trans World Airlines (TWA), six Delta Air Lines flights, four Eastern Air Lines flights and four Capital Airlines services. The November 1979 OAG shows jets on seven airlines. Nonstop flights flew from Toledo to:
 Air Florida:  Boeing 737-200 – Washington, D.C. National Airport
 Delta Air Lines:  Boeing 727-200, McDonnell Douglas DC-9-30 – Atlanta, Cincinnati, Dayton
 Eastern Air Lines: Boeing 727-200, McDonnell Douglas DC-9-50 – Columbus and direct to Miami and Tampa
 Frontier Airlines (1950-1986):  Boeing 737-200 – Detroit, MI and direct to Denver
 Trans World Airlines (TWA):  Boeing 727-100, Boeing 727-200 – St. Louis. In 1986 TWA had one flight to Cleveland and onto New York JFK
 United Airlines:  Boeing 727-100, Boeing 727-200, Boeing 737-200 – Chicago O'Hare Airport, Cleveland, Denver
USAir: BAC One-Eleven, McDonnell Douglas DC-9-30 – Pittsburgh

In 1979, the OAG shows Air Wisconsin and Comair at Toledo as independent commuter airlines, Air Wisconsin flying Fairchild Swearingen Metroliners nonstop to Chicago O'Hare and Detroit (DTW) while Comair Piper Navajos flew nonstop to Cincinnati. In February 1985, Piedmont Airlines (1948-1989) Boeing 727-200s flew to San Francisco (SFO) via Dayton, Ohio.

On January 8, 1989, American Eagle Airlines, operating for American Airlines, began nonstop service to Chicago O'Hare with four daily flights.  By December 1989, American Eagle had five nonstop weekday ATR-42s between Chicago and Toledo, while United Express, operated by Air Wisconsin, had four weekday round trips between Chicago and Toledo, three with Fokker F27s and one with a BAe 146-200.  

The OAG shows other airlines at Toledo at the end of 1989 including:
 Continental Express operated by Britt Airways:  Embraer EMB-120 Brasilia – nonstop commuter turboprop service to Cleveland, OH (CLE) Continental Express' last flight, to CLE, was to end on March 1. 2001
 Delta Air Lines:  Boeing 727-200, McDonnell Douglas DC-9-30 – nonstop service to Atlanta, GA (ATL) and Fort Wayne, IN (FWA)
 Delta Connection operated by Comair:  Fairchild Swearingen Metroliner – nonstop commuter turboprop service to Cincinnati, OH (CVG) On March 13, 2011, Delta Air Lines' last flight from Toledo, a Delta Connection CRJ flight to MSP, was operated. Northwest Airlines also operated from the airport until its acquisition by Delta. 
 Northwest Airlink operated by Mesaba Airlines:  Fairchild Swearingen Metroliner – nonstop commuter turboprop service to Detroit, MI (DTW)
 USAir:  Boeing 727-200, McDonnell Douglas DC-9-30 – nonstop service to Dayton, OH (DAY) and Pittsburgh, PA (PIT)
 USAir Express:  British Aerospace BAe Jetstream 31 – nonstop commuter turboprop service to Dayton, OH (DAY) and Indianapolis, IN (IND)
 1997 was the busiest year in Toledo Express' history with 679,841 passenger enplanements. A spike in growth that year was attributed to AirTran Airways offering low cost jet flights to Orlando, Florida.

After 1997, traffic began declining and airlines began suspending all service as a general trend in passenger traffic chose to drive to nearby Detroit Metropolitan Airport, a major hub airport.

On March 14, 2011, Delta Connection discontinued all service, leaving Toledo with only two airlines providing scheduled service: American Eagle with four flights per day to Chicago O'Hare and Allegiant Air with two flights per week to both Orlando and St. Petersburg, Florida. This was an historic low point for Toledo air service, and since then the airport has only seen Allegiant add two flights per week to Punta Gorda, FL in 2013 and American Eagle added two daily flights to Charlotte, NC in 2017. American did, however, drop its one daily flight to Chicago.
On March 13, 2012, Charter carrier Direct Air suspended operations from the airport. The charter carrier was subject to Chapter 7 liquidation on April 12, 2012.

On December 5, 2012, Allegiant Air announced new twice-weekly service from Toledo Express and Punta Gorda, FL, replacing previous suspended service by Direct Air.

On December 12, 2012, Sierra West Airlines, a cargo air carrier, signed a 30-year lease to open a new aircraft and crew base at Toledo. The airline announced it would lease a 17,555 sq. ft. hangar formerly used by BD Aeroworks.

On September 6, 2022, American Airlines' (Envoy Air) Embraer 145 flew out for the last time to Chicago O'Hare, marking the end of legacy airline passenger service at the airport.

Burlington Air Express / BAX Global hub
Toledo Express served as the main North American hub for DB Schenker, which acquired BAX Global, an international air cargo company, from 1993 until September 2011. DB Schenker leased a  warehouse facility with direct access to the runways at Toledo Express. They operated approximately 20 flights on average (with a peak of 42) per night from across the United States. Toledo Express was the 22nd busiest cargo hub in North America in 2009 with 241,472 tons handled. The facility is now home to the headquarters of BX Solutions, a ground logistics and shipping company started up by former BAX Global employees with plans to re-establish the former domestic BAX Global ground and eventually air networks.

Failed commercial start-up attempts
Toledo has had a few air service announcements made that never materialized or were dropped prior to being operated.

Passenger air service history
Airline service before 1955 operated from present-day Toledo Executive Airport, formerly known as Toledo Municipal Airport and Toledo Metcalf Airport.

* Carrier continues to serve other destinations.

Facilities & Aircraft

 7/25: 10,599 x 150 ft (3,231 x 46 m), asphalt
 16/34: 5,599 x 150 ft (1,707 x 46 m), asphalt

Structures
 81-acre air ramp on the south side of the airport used for air cargo, storage, ground shipping and aircraft diversions
 8-gate domestic passenger terminal on the north side of the airfield
 Common use air cargo and cold storage building on the north side of the airfield by the terminal
 5000 sq. ft. customs facility to handle inbound international flight crews, passengers, and cargo, opened in April 2016
The airport has three fixed-base operators offering fuel, general maintenance, hangars, courtesy vehicles, conference rooms, crew lounges, snooze rooms, showers, internet, and more.

Aircraft
For the 12-month period ending December 31, 2021, the airport had over 40,000 aircraft operations, or roughly 110 per day. This included 81% general aviation, 10% military, and 9% commercial. For the same time period, there are 82 aircraft based on the field: 27 single-engine and 14 multi-engine airplanes, 21 military aircraft, 17 jets, and 3 helicopters.

Passenger service

Terminal
Toledo Express has one passenger terminal with nine gates, of which three (Gates 3, 4, and 5) in the central part of the terminal are primarily used on a daily basis. The terminal features an east wing that comprises one upper-level gate (Gate 2) and two lower level gates (Gates 1 and 1A). The ground level gates are capable of supporting up to five total aircraft at once combined. The oldest part of the terminal is the western wing, which comprises Gates 6 through 8 (originally 5 through 7); these are rarely used. During the terminal upgrades that introduced a new gate area for Gate 4 and a brand new Gate 5, the original Gate 5 was renumbered to Gate 6. Previous Gate 6 (now 7) is inoperative and no longer has a jetbridge attached to it; previous Gate 7 (now 8) remains a stairwell to ramp-level boarding.

The terminal is mostly original from the 1950s, but several upgrades have taken place. This includes the remodeling and construction of the east wing as well as the new central gate area.

The terminal has two levels with the passenger waiting area, beyond security, on the upper level. In that area, the passengers have access to a food court and bar on the second level. There is also a children's play area. In front of security, there is a gift shop near the front entrances of the terminal near the airline ticket counters. Baggage claim is on the lower level on the east side of the terminal with two baggage carousels. The rental car counters are between the arrivals waiting area and the baggage claim. Free wireless (Wi-Fi) is available terminal-wide.

2013 true market study results
The Port Authority commissioned a true market study of the Toledo catchment area to determine opportunities for air service development. The study found 510,000 people are within 30 minutes of Toledo Express. The total catchment area encompasses 981,000 residents. The actual passengers per day each way for the Toledo market is 3,241, of which TOL only captures 5.7%. Detroit Metro captures the most of 64.3%, with the remaining traveling to other airports in Cleveland and Columbus. There are also 372 international passengers per day, of which Toledo captures only 2.8%.

Delta Air Lines was the largest airline in the Toledo area, with 44% of the traffic; United Airlines was second with 12.4%, and American Airlines (the only legacy airline serving TOL directly at the time) with 10.3%.

Top markets according to the report
 Orlando/Sanford is the largest market, with 259 daily passengers, with only 36 retained, or 13.9% of the market.
 Miami/Fort Lauderdale/West Palm Beach came in second, with 206 daily passengers and only 3 retained.
 Las Vegas was third, with 197 daily passengers and only 1 passenger retained each day.
 Chicago–O'Hare/Midway has 174 daily passengers and had 28 passengers retained each day, for 16% of the market.
 Tampa/St. Petersburg/Clearwater produced 152 daily passengers with 41 retained, or 27% of the market.
 Phoenix–Sky Harbor/Mesa
 Fort Myers/Punta Gorda
 New York City–JFK/LaGuardia/Newark
 Los Angeles/Burbank/Ontario/Orange County
 Baltimore/Washington DC–Dulles/National

Airlines and destinations

Passenger

Cargo

Ground transportation

Taxi and shuttle service
Taxi service at the airport is currently contracted to A1 Accurate Limousine and Airport Service. While other taxi operators are available in Toledo, none are currently able to stage at the airport.

Car rental companies
Toledo Express is currently served by Alamo, Avis, Budget, Enterprise, Hertz, and National.

Parking lots
The airport offers two parking lots: short term and long term. Both are located on the south side of the airport. The parking lot is operated by Republic Parking Systems and it is also a partner of the Thanks Again rewards program.

Government and military operations
The airport is also home to Toledo Air National Guard Base and the 180th Fighter Wing (180 FW), an Air Combat Command (ACC)-gained unit of the Ohio Air National Guard.
Toledo ANGB consists of a Federal enclave of  leased by the Department of Defense for the State of Ohio and the Ohio Air National Guard, housing combat-ready F-16C Fighting Falcon jet fighters and associated Air National Guard support units.  Physical facilities consist of 3 administrative, 13 industrial and 7 services building (including hangar facilities), totaling nearly 322,000 square feet.

There are 21 military aircraft based at TOL, supported by 290 full-time Air Reserve Technician (ART) and Active Guard and Reserve (AGR) personnel.  Over 600 additional part-time Traditional Air National Guardsmen round out the balance of the 180 FW, capable of deploying worldwide to meet Air Force and combatant commander requirements as part of the Air Reserve Component of the U.S. Air Force. Concurrently, the 180 FW also provides traditional National Guard state support roles in the event of local and state emergencies to the Governor of Ohio.

Airport based businesses and organizations

Fixed-base operators
 Grand Aire operates as a fixed-base operator on the northwest side of the airport.
 National Flight Services operates as a fixed-base operator on the north side of the airport, and also as an engine overhaul and aircraft maintenance facility.
 TOL Aviation operates as a fixed-base operator on the north side of the airport.

Aerospace companies
 Toledo Jet Center is a business jet maintenance and avionics services company that specializes in the Cessna Citation aircraft series.
 BD Aero Works is an aircraft charter and maintenance provider.
 Quick Flight is an airline services company offer handling services at over 30 airports across the country for both above- and below-wing services. The company's headquarters is located just west of the airport in Swanton.

Corporate hangars
 Toledo Express is used for several Toledo area companies as a base for their corporate aircraft. These include Owens-Illinois and Owens-Corning.
 Promedica Air houses its air ambulances at Toledo Express.

Toledo–Lucas County Port Authority
Toledo–Lucas County Port Authority:
 President – Paul Toth
 Airport Manager – Stephen Arnold
 Manager of Airport Administration – Linda Friend
 Receptionist/Administrative Secretary – Joyce Amborski
 Operations Specialist – Dan Spaugy
 Operations Specialist – Kyle Garris

Education
 Toledo Public Schools operated a training center at the airport known as the TPS Aerospace Center from 1973 to 2018. As of 2018, after acquiring the retired Flight Safety building, it has become known as the Aerospace and Natural Science Academy of Toledo or ANSAT. The academy is home to approximately 300-400 students from grades 9-12 and is known for its yearly air expos.

Cargo Development Zone and Joint Economic Development District
In 2013, the Port Authority backed a plan to collect income tax from businesses and employees on property at the airport owned by the Port Authority and other entities that sign on to the agreement. The income tax would be distributed to an airport fund in addition to the participating communities of the city of Toledo and Monclova and Swanton townships. The airport fund would take 55% of the first $500,000, 52.5% of the next $250,000, and declining from there. If revenues are over $1.5 million, the airport would see roughly 24.12% according to reports. A Port Authority Airport Committee meeting also stated that the City of Toledo's share would also be redirected back to the airport fund boosting revenues.

The Cargo Development Zone is an area on the south side of the airport to the south of Runway 7–25, west of Runway 16–34, and north of US-20A. The site features onsite customers and a foreign trade zone. The development area will also provide access to the 78-acre air cargo ramp.

Accidents & Incidents
On October 29, 1960, a chartered plane carrying the Cal Poly football team, hours after a loss to Bowling Green State University, crashed on takeoff at the Toledo Express Airport. Twenty-two of the forty-eight people on board were killed, including sixteen players, the team's student manager, and a Cal Poly football booster. This is the deadliest accident to occur at Toledo Express Airport.
 In the early morning hours of February 15, 1992, an Air Transport International Douglas DC-8-63F cargo jet (tail number N794AL), operating for Burlington Air Express as Flight 805, crashed 3 miles north of the runway into a wheat field just after executing its second missed approach. All four crew members perished and the aircraft, carrying mostly computer parts, was completely destroyed. The cause of the crash is listed as "spatial disorientation" by the captain.
On April 8, 2003, a Dassault Falcon 20 operated by Grand Aire Express, an instructional flight inbound from Traverse City Airport crashed during an instrument landing system (ILS) approach to Toledo Express Airport descending below the glide slope. Failure to maintain airspeed during the landing configuration and icing conditions contributed to the accident. All three occupants (2 pilots, 1 passenger) were killed.
On September 11, 2019, a Convair 440 operating as a cargo plane crashed near the airport while preparing to land. Both occupants were killed.

References

External links

Toledo Express Airport (official site)
Toledo–Lucas County Port Authority (official site)
Fly Toledo / Northwest Ohio Aviation Council 
180th Fighter Wing, Ohio Air National Guard (official site)
Toledo Express Airport (ANG) (GlobalSecurity.org)

Transportation in Toledo, Ohio
Airports in Ohio
Buildings and structures in Lucas County, Ohio
Transportation in Lucas County, Ohio